Rogue Cop is a 1954 American film noir directed by Roy Rowland, based on the novel by William P. McGivern, and starring Robert Taylor, Janet Leigh, and George Raft.

Plot
Christopher Kelvaney is a crooked police officer who takes bribes and payoffs from criminals and other nefarious folk. His brother Eddie is a young member of the police force who is honest and loyal.

In a penny arcade, a drug dealer is stabbed to death by a man who claims the territory for himself, and Eddie witnesses the murderer flee. Mob boss Dan Beaumonte gives orders to Kelvaney to buy his brother's silence. Eddie refuses, and Kelvaney is unable to persuade Eddie's sweetheart, nightclub singer Karen Stephenson, to change his mind.

The ruthless Beaumonte brutally mistreats his moll Nancy Corlane, who then tries to help Kelvaney do what he has to do. Kelvaney exposes the fact that Karen was once a mobster's girlfriend in Miami. He gets her to admit that she's not in love with Eddie and is willing to let him go if it will save his life.

An out-of-town button-man named Langley is brought in to kill both brothers, but succeeds only in killing Eddie. His conscience aroused, Kelvaney goes after the mob leaders himself. He admits his corruption to superiors, but asks for a chance to bring them evidence that will convict those responsible for his brother's murder.  In order to bring down Beaumont's entire syndicate, Kelvaney his prepared to tell what he knows about all of their illegal activities, even though this will implicate himself.  Kelvaney succeeds in apprehending Langley, although he is shot in the process.  He asks for forgiveness for his crooked ways on the way to the hospital

Cast
 Robert Taylor as Det. Sgt. Christopher Kelvaney
 Janet Leigh as Karen Stephenson
 George Raft as Dan Beaumonte
 Steve Forrest as Eddie Kelvaney
 Anne Francis as Nancy Corlane
 Robert Ellenstein as Det. Sidney Y. Myers
 Robert F. Simon as Ackerman
 Anthony Ross as Father Ahearn
 Alan Hale, Jr. as Johnny Stark
 Peter Brocco as George 'Wrinkles' Fallon
 Vince Edwards as Joey Langley
 Olive Carey as Selma
 Roy Barcroft as Lt. Vince D. Bardeman
 Dale Van Sickel as Manny
 Ray Teal as Patrolman Mullins
 Nesdon Booth as Detective Garrett
 Robert Burton as Inspector Adrian Cassidy

Production
The film was based on a 1954 novel by William McGiven, who had written the novel on which The Big Heat was based. The New York Times called it "a classic study in guilt, retribution and atonement - without for an instant forgetting to tell an exciting story of swift action."

MGM bought the screen rights prior to publication in November 1953 and assigned Nicholas Nayfack to produce. Sidney Boehm, who had adapted The Big Heat, wrote the script.

In March 1954 MGM assigned Robert Taylor to star, with shooting to begin in May. Filming was pushed back on another Taylor film, Many Rivers to Cross.

In April 1954 Roy Rowland was assigned to direct Support roles were given to Janet Leigh, Steve Forrest and George Raft; the latter was making his first "A" picture in some years.

It was the last film Leigh made under her contract at MGM where she had been for eight years.

Anne Francis was cast as Raft's moll. Francis described it as "the one part I've been waiting for" and it led to her being signed to a long term contract by MGM.

Reception

Box Office
According to MGM records the film earned $1,417,000 in the US and Canada and $1,092,000 elsewhere resulting in a profit of $920,000.

Critical response
Film critic Bosley Crowther gave the film a positive review and wrote, "This is not a new thesis. They've been making movies on it for years. And Rogue Cop is not so exceptional in its construction or performance that it is likely to cause surprise. But it is a well-done melodrama, produced and directed in a hard, crisp style, and it is very well acted by Robert Taylor in the somewhat disagreeable title role...For what it is in the line of crime pictures, there's a lot to be said for Rogue Cop."

It led to a brief comeback in "A" pictures for George Raft.

Awards
Nominations
 Academy Awards: Oscar, Best Cinematography, Black-and-White, John F. Seitz; 1955.

References

External links
 
 
 
 Rogue Cop essay by author Stone Wallace at Film Noir of the Week 
Review of film at Variety
 

1954 films
1954 crime drama films
American black-and-white films
American crime drama films
Film noir
Films about brothers
Films based on American novels
Films based on crime novels
Films directed by Roy Rowland
Metro-Goldwyn-Mayer films
1950s English-language films
1950s American films